Bare Bones Software is a private North Chelmsford, Massachusetts, United States software company developing software tools for the Apple Macintosh platform.  The company developed the BBEdit text editor, marketed under the registered trademark "It doesn't suck", and has been mentioned as a "top-tier Mac developer" by Mac OS X journalist John Siracusa.

The company was founded in May 1993, and incorporated under the Commonwealth of Massachusetts in June 1994.

Product list
 BBEdit Professional HTML and Text Editor.
 Yojimbo Information Organizer.

Discontinued:
 BBEdit Lite Free "lightweight" Text Editor (replaced by TextWrangler).
 Mailsmith Email client (ownership transferred to Stickshift Software; became freeware).
 Super Get Info File and folder info utility for Mac OS X. (discontinued)
 TextWrangler Free, lightweight Text Editor which replaced BBEdit Lite (replaced by BBEdit).
 WeatherCal application that adds weather forecasts to iCal (discontinued on July 31, 2011).

References

External links
 
 2006 E-mail interview with Bare Bones founder Rich Siegel

Macintosh software companies
Software companies based in Massachusetts
Software companies of the United States

American companies established in 1994
Information technology companies of the United States
Companies based in Chelmsford, Massachusetts
1994 establishments in Massachusetts
Software companies established in 1994